is a Japanese anime series which centers on gods, guardian angels, animal spirits, and magic.  It is a spin-off of the series Angel Tales.

Saint Beast is originally a CD drama centering on the lives of the six Holy Beasts, and their attraction to one another. Seeing the CD Drama being a huge success and spawning over 20 CDs, Wonderfarm created the small 6 episode series for fan service. As of 2005 two new OVAs were made, but this time they focused on what had happened back in the heavens. Recently in the early 2006, a new side story of Saint Beast called Saint Beast:Others was started. And the first CD drama was released on September 21, 2006. In 2007, another Saint Beast series called Saint Beast - Kouin Jojishi Tenshi Tan started.

Plot

The seal which was used to imprison the 2 fallen angels, Kirin no Judas and Houou no Luca, is broken and the two decide to get their revenge on God by getting rid of Heaven that had once been their home and create the true paradise which is Hell. Soon, the guardian angels on Earth begin disappearing, and no one in Heaven can explain the happenings. But there is a sense of a vengeful animal spirit at work, and so the Four Saint Beasts are called upon to investigate.

The 4 Gods of Beasts attempts to rescue the guardian angels, as well as to find out what this evil animal spirit is...

Episodes
Episodes of the 2003 and 2007 TV series.

Saint Beast: Seijuu Kourin Hen

Saint Beast: Kouin Jojishi Tenshi Tan

References
 Saint Beast Official Anime Website 
 Saint Beast Official Anime Website 

2003 anime television series debuts
2005 anime OVAs
2007 anime television series debuts
Action anime and manga